This is a list of castles in Saudi Arabia.

 Ajyad Fortress
 Al-Faqir Fort
 Al-Ukhaydir, Tabuk Province
 Dhat al-Hajj
 Kasbah
 Marid Castle
 Masmak fort
 Qal'at al-Qatif
 Qamus
Qasr al-Farid
Qasr Ibrahim
Asfan Castle
 Qishla of Jeddah
 Qishla of Mecca
 Qishlah
 Shanqal Fort
 Tarout Castle
 Tarout Island
 Uqair

References 

Saudi Arabia
Lists of castles in the Middle East
Castles
Saudi Arabia
Castles